Scott Rogowsky (born December 4, 1984) is an American comedian and television personality. He is best known for his time hosting HQ Trivia, a mobile game show.

Early life
Rogowsky was born in Manhattan and raised in Harrison, New York. He graduated from Johns Hopkins University in 2007 with a degree in political science.

Career

Beginnings 
Since 2011, Rogowsky has hosted Running Late with Scott Rogowsky, a live talk show held at various venues around New York City (such as the Gramercy Theater) and Los Angeles. Guests have included comedians, musicians, authors, and actors.

Rogowsky gained notoriety as the creator of several viral videos, including 10 Hours of Walking in NYC as a Jew, and Taking Fake Book Covers on the Subway. In 2017, he hosted a "pop-up" talk show, Start T@lkin, which streamed on Go90 for one season.

HQ Trivia 
In August 2017, Rogowsky began as the primary host of HQ Trivia, an app and trivia game. Following its launch, Rogowsky gained a significant cult following among the game's players. Rogowsky's catchphrase, "let's get down to the nitty-gritty," was spoken at least once each episode of HQ Trivia, and is a quote from the song "AC/DC Bag" by Phish. In 2019, Rogowsky joined DAZN and began hosting a sports program. A month later, it was confirmed that Scott had stopped hosting HQ Trivia.

Later broadcasting career 
In March 2019, Rogowsky began co-hosting ChangeUp, a baseball program broadcast on the subscription video streaming network DAZN. A month later, it was confirmed that he had stopped hosting HQ Trivia due to an inability to organize a scheduling agreement around the two shows. During the COVID-19 pandemic, Rogowsky hosted a livestreamed comedy show called "IsoLateNight" in which he interviewed other comedians in isolation. He sold some of his collection of vintage shirts to raise money for charities. Rogowsky was selected to host a web-based trivia game for the antacid brand TUMS during the broadcast of Super Bowl LVI. The show took place via the brand's Twitter account as the game was in progress.

Vintage clothing sales

Rogowsky started collecting and selling vintage clothing in 2003. He started an Instagram account called Quiz Daddy's Closet in 2019 and sold some items to raise money for charity. In January 2022, he opened a physical storefront, also called "Quiz Daddy’s Closet", in Santa Monica, California. After Jeopardy! host Alex Trebek died of pancreatic cancer, Rogowsky bought many of Trebek's garments, which he auctioned to raise funds for the Lustgarten Foundation for Pancreatic Cancer Research.

Personal life
Rogowsky is Jewish. He is a brother of the Alpha Epsilon Pi fraternity. Rogowsky also enjoys baseball and is an avid fan of the New York Mets.

References

External links
Running Late with Scott Rogowsky

1984 births
Living people
American game show hosts
American stand-up comedians
Comedians from New York City
21st-century American comedians
Shorty Award winners
Jewish American male comedians
21st-century American Jews